Mary Lambert may refer to:

 Mary Lambert (director) (born 1951), American film and television director
 Mary Lambert (singer) (born 1989), American singer-songwriter